Barayen (also Romanized as Barāyen; also known as Barīn) is a village in Kuhsarat Rural District, in the Central District of Minudasht County, Golestan Province, Iran. At the 2006 census, its population was 594, in 142 families.

References 

Populated places in Minudasht County